The following is a list of the winners of the Ashden Awards, grouped by year.

Full details of their work can be found in the database on the Ashden Awards website.

2019

2018

2017

2016

2015

2014

2013

2012

2011

2010

2009

2008

2007

2006

2005

2004

2003

2002

2001

See also

 Renewable energy
 Energy Globe Awards

External links
 

Ashden Awards